The Water Engine is an American historical drama television film directed by Steven Schachter and written by David Mamet, based on his 1977 play of the same name. The film stars Patti LuPone, William H. Macy, John Mahoney, Joe Mantegna, and Treat Williams. It was released on TNT on August 24, 1992.

Plot

Charles Lang works at a menial job at a factory and lives with his blind sister Rita in an apartment in Chicago during the 1934 World's Fair. But he is also an amateur inventor, and the play centers around a machine he designs that can create electricity from distilled water. Seeking to patent his idea, he finds a lawyer, Mason Gross, in the phone book and shows him the machine, but Gross’s motivations seem to differ from Lang’s. Gross recruits another lawyer, Lawrence Oberman, and together they menace Lang and eventually his sister. It is heavily implied that the two of them serve the corporate establishment whose profits Lang’s engine threatens.

By the time Lang realizes he is being taken advantage of, the lawyers have him trapped. He attempts to contact a newspaper reporter, but Gross and Oberman hold his sister hostage to prevent him from telling his story. He then meets a barker at the World’s Fair right before it closes for the night who tells him of a chain letter he has just received, which gives him an idea.

The lawyers try to force Lang into giving them his plans, but he says he no longer has them; the audience finds out from a scene in the newspaper reporter’s office that he and Rita have been killed. The play ends with Bernie, a young friend of the family who has previously shown mechanical aptitude, receiving the plans for the Water Engine in the mail.

Cast
Joe Mantegna as Lawrence Oberman
John Mahoney as Mason Gross
Charles Durning as Tour Guide
Patti LuPone as Rita Lang
William H. Macy as Charles Lang
Treat Williams as Dave Murray
Joanna Miles as Mrs. Varek
Mike Nussbaum as Mr. Wallace

Reception

Critical response
Tom Shales of the Washington Post noted that "Water Engine has a palpable brilliance, and that's in the production design of Barry Robison. At every turn, the look is first-class and imaginative, especially during later scenes set at the Hall of Science of the Chicago World's Fair. You feel you're watching a real movie and not a TV movie." Tony Scott of Variety wrote that "director Steven Schachter goes for an arty mode of some filmmaking, with angled shots, stylized acting, Mamet's pseudo-naturalistic dialogue, and an unswerving storyline from which subplots bloom and fade."

Accolades

References

External links
 
 

1992 films
1992 drama films
1992 television films
1990s historical drama films
1990s English-language films
American films based on plays
American historical drama films
American drama television films
Films set in 1934
Films set in Chicago
Films directed by Steven Schachter
Films based on works by David Mamet
Films with screenplays by David Mamet
TNT Network original films
World's fairs in fiction
1990s American films
Century of Progress